The Schornstein Grocery and Saloon is a commercial/residential building in Saint Paul, Minnesota, United States. It was built in 1884 for $5,000 in the French Second Empire style, this Dayton's Bluff business was designed by architect Augustus F. Gauger (1852-1929). It is listed on the National Register of Historic Places.

It was built by William Schornstein, "a prominent member of the local German American community," who lived on the premises with his wife Wilhelmina from 1885–1920, running a grocery and saloon. "The establishment was especially popular among the area’s German-Americans and there was a large hall on the third floor for meetings and special events."

References

Commercial buildings completed in 1884
Commercial buildings on the National Register of Historic Places in Minnesota
Drinking establishments on the National Register of Historic Places in Minnesota
National Register of Historic Places in Saint Paul, Minnesota
Second Empire architecture in Minnesota
German-American culture in Minneapolis–Saint Paul
Italianate architecture in Minnesota